The 1980 United States presidential election in Maine took place on November 4, 1980. All fifty states and The District of Columbia were part of the 1980 United States presidential election. Voters chose four electors to the Electoral College, who voted for president and vice president. Maine was won by former California Governor Ronald Reagan (R) by a slim margin of 3%, carrying fourteen out of sixteen counties. In recent years, however, the state has grown much more liberal, and no Republican presidential nominee has carried it since 1988.

The already embattled incumbent Democratic president Carter was hurt in the state by the strong third party candidacy of John B. Anderson, a liberal Republican Congressman who ran in 1980 as an independent after failing to win the Republican Party's own presidential nomination. Anderson proved very popular with liberal and moderate voters in New England who normally leaned Democratic but were dissatisfied with the policies of the Carter administration and viewed Reagan as too far to the right. New England overall would prove to be Anderson's strongest region in the nation, with all six New England states giving double-digit percentages to Anderson. However, Maine would prove to be Anderson's weakest state in New England with only 10.20% of the popular vote, whereas all five of the other states in New England gave Anderson over 12% of the popular vote, peaking at 15.15% in Massachusetts. This was the last presidential election in which Hancock County was the most Republican county in Maine.

Primaries

Results

Results by congressional district
Reagan won both of Maine's congressional districts.

Results by county

See also
 United States presidential elections in Maine
 Presidency of Ronald Reagan

References

Maine
1980
1980 Maine elections